Constant is a given name, and may refer to:

 André Henri Constant van Hasselt (1806–1874), Flemish poet
 André Marie Constant Duméril (1774–1860), French zoologist
 Constant Chevillon (1880–1944), Grand Master of the Freemasonry Rite of Memphis-Misraïm
 Constant d'Aubigné (circa 1584–1647), French nobleman
 Constant de Kerchove de Denterghem (1790–1865), Belgian liberal politician
 Constant Feith (1884–1958), Dutch amateur football player
 Constant Fornerod (1819–1899), Swiss politician
 Constant Fouard (1837–1903), French ecclesiastical writer
 Constant Huret (1870–1951), long distance track racing cyclist
 Constant Janssen (1895–1970), Belgian physician and businessman
 Constant Lambert (1905–1951), British composer and conductor
 Constant Le Marchand de Lignery (1662–1732), French military officer
 Constant Lestienne (born 1992), French tennis player
 Constant Martin, inventor of the Clavioline
 Constant Nieuwenhuys (1920–2005), Dutch painter, generally known simply as Constant
 Constant Permeke (1886–1952), Belgian painter
 Constant Prévost (1787–1856), French geologist
 Constant Tonegaru (1919–1952), Romanian poet
 Constant Troyon (1810–1865), French painter
 Constant Vanden Stock (born 1914), honorary president and former president and player of Belgian football club R.S.C. Anderlecht
 Jean Michel Constant Leber (1780–1859), French historian and bibliophile
 Jean René Constant Quoy (1790–1869), French zoologist
 Marie Philibert Constant Sappey (1810–1896), French anatomist

See also

 Constance (name)
 Constant (surname)
 Constantine (name)
 Constant-Désiré
 Benjamin-Constant
 Benoît-Constant
 Saint-Constant (disambiguation)

French masculine given names
Masculine given names